The Brixentaler Ache is river of Tyrol, Austria, a right tributary of the Inn. It passes through the districts of Kitzbühel and Kufstein.

Course 

The Brixentaler Ache rises as the Brixenbach in the territory of Brixen im Thale and flows westwards through the Brixental, a southeastern valley of the Lower Inn Valley. Between Westendorf and Hopfgarten im Brixental (the main village in the valley) the valley floor narrows. Immediately after this bottleneck the Windauer Ache joins the Brixenbach from the south. From this confluence the Brixenbach is known as the Brixentaler Ache. After about one kilometre the larger Kelchsauer Ache (also from the south) joins the river.

Between Hopfgarten and the section of river forming the boundary between Kirchbichl and Wörgl, the Ache is again forced through a gorge, before it breaks out into the plains of the Inn Valley. On leaving the gorge the Ache is impounded by a large weir and part of the water is diverted into a channel that leads to a small power station run by Tiroler Wasserkraft. Below the weir the Luecher Bach enters the main stream from the direction of Söll to the north. After having been fed by so much water from its large tributaries the Ache now dominates the landscape of the broad and densely settled Brixental valley.

The river's catchment area is relatively large, especially as a result of its tributaries, the Windauer Ache and Kelchsauer Ache, and covers about a third of the territory of Kitzbühel District.

References

Rivers of Tyrol (state)
Kitzbühel Alps
Kitzbühel District
Rivers of Austria